Myrtle is a feminine given name or nickname derived from the plant name Myrtus; it was popular during the Victorian era, along with other plant and flower names. Myrtle, a symbol of a happy marriage, is often included in a bridal bouquet. Variants include the French-language Myrtille, and Mirtel, a popular name for newborn girls in Estonia during 2012.

Notable people and characters with the name include:

People
 Myrtle Allen (1924–2018), Irish chef
 Myrtle Augee (born 1965), English shot putter
 Myrtle Cook (1902–1985), Canadian track and field athlete
 Myrtle Corbin (1868–1928), American sideshow entertainer
 Myrtle Devenish (1913–2007), Welsh actress
 Myrtle Edwards (1921–2010), Australian cricketer and softball player
 Myrtle Elvyn (c.1887–1975), American pianist
 Myrtle Fillmore (1845–1931), American who co-founded Unity, a church within the New Thought Christian movement
 Myrtille Georges (born 1990), French tennis player
 Myrtille Gollin (born 1984), French speed skater
 Myrtle Gonzalez (1891–1918), American actress
 Myrtle "Molly" Kool (1916–2009), Canadian sea captain
 Myrtle Maclagan (1911–1993), English cricketer
 Myrtle McAteer (1878–1952), American tennis player
 Myrtle Reed (1874–1911), American poet
 Myrtle Robertson, 11th Baroness Wharton (1934–2000), English photographer
 Myrtle Sarrosa, (born 1994), Filipino cosplayer, actress, singer and Big Winner of Pinoy Big Brother Teen Edition 4
 Myrtle Stedman (1883–1938), American actress
 Myrtle Vail (1888–1978), American radio actress and writer

Fictional characters
 Myrtle, recurring character in the films Diary of a Mad Black Woman and Madea's Family Reunion
 Myrtle, character in the comic strip Right Around Home
 Myrtle Anagnostou, character in the Greek soap opera Erotas
 Myrtle "Tilly" Dunnage, character in the Rosalie Ham novel The Dressmaker and its film adaptation
 Myrtle of Durin, a Vanguard-type character from the mobile game Arknights
 Myrtle Fargate, character in the soap opera All My Children
 Myrtle Snow, Antagonist in the third season of the series American Horror Story: Coven
 Moaning Myrtle, or Myrtle Warren (1929–1943), character in the Harry Potter series
 Myrtle Wilson, character in the novel The Great Gatsby by F. Scott Fitzgerald

See also
 Mertle Edmonds, a fictional character from Disney's Lilo & Stitch franchise

References

English feminine given names
English-language feminine given names
Given names derived from plants or flowers